The following is a list of characters appearing in the animated television series, The Avengers: Earth's Mightiest Heroes. The series itself is based on the fictional comic book superhero team the Avengers published by Marvel Comics.

Avengers

Avengers (Main)

New Avengers

Supporting

Avengers Support Crew

S.H.I.E.L.D.

Other supporting

Villains

Masters of Evil

HYDRA

Other villains

References

Lists of Marvel Comics animated series characters
Lists of Avengers (comics) characters
Lists of characters in American television animation
Characters